Clepsis agenjoi is a species of moth of the family Tortricidae. It is found in Spain.

References

Moths described in 1950
Clepsis